Shekinna Stricklen (born July 30, 1990) is an American basketball forward who is currently a free agent in the Women's National Basketball Association (WNBA). Born in Conway, Arkansas, she went to Morrilton High School, which she helped lead to a state championship in 2006, and played collegiately for the Tennessee Lady Vols. She was selected Freshman of the Year by the USBWA.

College statistics

Source

USA Basketball

Stricklen was a member of the USA Women's U18 team which won the gold medal at the FIBA Americas Championship in Buenos Aires, Argentina. The event was held in July 2008, when the USA team defeated host Argentina to win the championship. Stricklen helped the team win all five games, scoring 8.0 points per game. She was also the second leading rebounder with 7.6 per game.

Stricklen played on the team presenting the US at the 2011 World University Games held in Shenzhen, China. The team, coached by Bill Fennelly, won all six games to earn the gold medal. Stricklen averaged 5.3 points per game.

Professional career
She was selected in the first round of the 2012 WNBA Draft (2nd overall) by the Seattle Storm.

On January 28, 2015 Stricklen was traded along with Camille Little to the Connecticut Sun for Renee Montgomery, and the third and fifteen overall picks of the 2015 WNBA draft.

In 2016, Fenerbahçe Istanbul announced her transfer to the club.

Stricklen won the 2019 WNBA Three Point Contest the day before the 2019 WNBA All-Star Game.

Stricklen signed a two-year contract with the Atlanta Dream on February 16, 2020.

References

1990 births
Living people
All-American college women's basketball players
American women's basketball players
Atlanta Dream players
Basketball players from Arkansas
Connecticut Sun players
Forwards (basketball)
McDonald's High School All-Americans
Medalists at the 2011 Summer Universiade
Parade High School All-Americans (girls' basketball)
People from Conway, Arkansas
Seattle Storm draft picks
Seattle Storm players
Tennessee Lady Volunteers basketball players
Universiade gold medalists for the United States
Universiade medalists in basketball